Ostrov Dolgy is a rural locality (a settlement) in Rassvetsky Selsoviet, Narimanovsky District, Astrakhan Oblast, Russia. The population was 18 as of 2010. There are 2 streets.

Geography 
Ostrov Dolgy is located 62 km southeast of Narimanov (the district's administrative centre) by road. Rastopulovka is the nearest rural locality.

References 

Rural localities in Narimanovsky District